The 1979 Mercedes Cup, was a men's tennis tournament played on outdoor clay courts and held in Stuttgart, West Germany that was part of the 1979 Grand Prix circuit. It was the second edition of the tournament and was held from 16 July until 22 July 1979. Fourth-seeded Tomáš Šmíd won the singles title.

Finals

Singles
 Tomáš Šmíd defeated  Ulrich Pinner, 6–4, 6–0, 6–2
 It was Šmíd's 1st singles title of the year and the 2nd of his career.

Doubles
 Frew McMillan /  Colin Dowdeswell defeated  Wojciech Fibak /  Pavel Složil, 6–4, 6–2, 2–6, 6–4

References

External links
 Official website 
 ATP tournament profile

Stuttgart Open
Stuttgart Open
1979 in German tennis